Ligorio is a surname. Notable people with the surname include:
 Ligorio López (1933–1993), Mexican footballer
 Loren Ligorio (born 1955), Croatian painter
 Orsat Ligorio (born 1985), Croatian and Serbian linguist
 Pirro Ligorio (c. 1512/1513-1583), Italian architect, painter and antiquarian